Noah Whipple Bean (born August 20, 1978) is an American actor best known for his roles as Ryan Fletcher on The CW action-thriller series Nikita, as David Connor on the FX legal drama Damages and his leading performance in the independent film The Pill.

Career
Prior to his role on Damages, Bean had a number of minor and less notable roles on the television series Law & Order: Special Victims Unit, Ed, Joan of Arcadia, Numb3rs, and Crumbs, the films Williamstowne and Stay, and a number of commercials.

He labels his signing on the role of David Connor on Damages, the fiancé of the protagonist, as being "lucky", praising the script of the show and also the fact that it is shot in New York City, where he is currently living. He also says he was aware that his character dies in the first season and was disappointed but "thrilled" for the opportunity to have a full season. He also summarizes working with Glenn Close, Željko Ivanek and Ted Danson as "a dream come true". Bean returned for guest appearances in one episode each of the show's second, third, and fifth seasons.

Bean has also been involved in theatre, Broadway and off-Broadway. His first role was in Philadelphia Here I Come!, a role which he was offered when the originally cast actor left the show four days before the opening. He co-runs a theatre company, Stage 13, with several other actors, directors and playwrights, including Dan Fogler, in New York, and although he prefers screen acting, he says, "I love the theater and would always go back to do a play if it was an exciting project." He appeared as a guest star in the episode "Ability" of the TV series Fringe. In 2015, he starred as Aaron Marker in Syfy's Science-Fiction series 12 Monkeys.

He was also a series regular on The CW television series Nikita, as CIA Agent Ryan Fletcher.

Personal life
Bean was born in Boston, Massachusetts. As a child, Bean attended Pine Point School and The Williams School in Connecticut. An only child, he describes himself as being so quiet and shy that his school would phone his parents asking whether anything was wrong at home: "I was deathly shy and basically scared of people in general." In high school, his mother encouraged him to become involved in drama, which he says helped him open up, "I found when I had a script in my hand I could speak." He later attended Boston University's College of Fine Arts before he was offered his first theatre role by director Michael Ritchie.

The son of Ruth Crocker, an author, and Richard Robert Bean, a housebuilder, Bean hails from Mystic, Connecticut, although he has lived and worked in Los Angeles and is currently living in New York City. He is friends with actor Seth Gabel and director Jack Bender and also says he has come to be good friends with Damages co-actor and on-screen fiancée Rose Byrne.

Bean began a relationship with his Nikita co-star Lyndsy Fonseca in 2013. In February 2016, Fonseca announced their engagement, and they were married on October 2, 2016. They have a two daughters: Greta Lilia Bean (born February 2, 2018) and Evelyn Estella Bean (born June 20, 2022).

Filmography

Film

Television

References

External links

Noah Bean Daily

American male stage actors
American male television actors
American male film actors
Male actors from Connecticut
1978 births
Living people
21st-century American male actors
People from Mystic, Connecticut